Thallium has several oxides:

Thallium(I) oxide Tl2O
Thallium(III) oxide Tl2O3
 Thallium(I) superoxide or thallium dioxide TlO2
 Tl4O3